Aechmea politii is a plant species in the genus Aechmea. This species is native to Venezuela, Colombia, Guyana and French Guiana.

References

politii
Flora of South America
Plants described in 1957